Synuchus breviusculus is a species of ground beetle in the subfamily Harpalinae. It was described by Mannerheim in 1849.

References

Synuchus
Beetles described in 1849